German submarine U-598 was a Type VIIC U-boat of Nazi Germany's Kriegsmarine during World War II.

She carried out four patrols, was part of four wolfpacks and sank two ships; she also damaged one other.

The boat was sunk by depth charges from two US aircraft, off the Brazilian coast on 23 July 1943.

Design
German Type VIIC submarines were preceded by the shorter Type VIIB submarines. U-598 had a displacement of  when at the surface and  while submerged. She had two shafts and two  propellers.

U-598 was fitted with five  torpedo tubes (four fitted at the bow and one at the stern), fourteen torpedoes, one  SK C/35 naval gun, 220 rounds, and a  C/30 anti-aircraft gun. The boat had a complement of between forty-four and sixty.

Service history
The submarine was laid down on 11 January 1941 at Blohm & Voss, Hamburg as yard number 574, launched on 2 October 1941 and commissioned on 27 November under the command of Korvettenkapitän Gottfried Holtorf.

She served with the 8th U-boat Flotilla from 27 November 1941 for training and the 6th flotilla for operations from 1 July 1942 until her loss.

First patrol
U-598s first patrol began from Kiel on 7 July 1942. She headed for the Atlantic Ocean via the gap separating Iceland and the Faroe Islands. One man drowned while carrying out maintenance on hydroplanes and propellers in mid-Atlantic on 5 August.

She damaged the Standella, sank the Michael Jebsen and the Empire Corporal, all on 14 August northwest of Barlovento Point, Cuba. She had been repaired and returned to service in 1942.

The boat arrived at St. Nazaire, in occupied France on 13 September.

Second and third patrols
U-598s second sortie was to the south of Greenland; it was relatively uneventful.

Her third foray also started and finished in St. Nazaire between March and May 1943.

Fourth patrol and loss
The boat departed St. Nazaire for the last time on 26 June 1943. On 23 July she was sunk by depth charges dropped by two US Navy PB4Y-1 Liberators of VB-107 near Natal (on the Brazilian coast) at position .

Forty-three men died with U-598; there were two survivors.

Wolfpacks
U-598 took part in four wolfpacks, namely:
 Jaguar (18 – 31 January 1943) 
 Stürmer (11 – 20 March 1943) 
 Seeteufel (23 – 30 March 1943) 
 Meise (11 – 27 April 1943)

Summary of raiding history

References

Bibliography

External links

German Type VIIC submarines
U-boats commissioned in 1941
U-boats sunk in 1943
U-boats sunk by US aircraft
U-boats sunk by depth charges
1941 ships
Ships built in Hamburg
World War II submarines of Germany
World War II shipwrecks in the Atlantic Ocean
World War II shipwrecks in the South Atlantic
Maritime incidents in July 1943